Gino Windmüller (born 20 June 1989) is a  German footballer who plays for 1. FC Bocholt. He made his professional debut for Regensburg on 20 July 2013 in a 3. Liga match against SpVgg Unterhaching.

References

External links
 
 

1989 births
Living people
German footballers
SSV Jahn Regensburg players
Rot-Weiss Essen players
Wuppertaler SV players
VfR Aalen players
1. FC Bocholt players
3. Liga players
Regionalliga players
Oberliga (football) players
Association football defenders